Om Prakash Sahani, known as Om, is an Indian actor who works in Indian Bengali films and Bangladeshi films and television shows. His first acting role was in Arjun – Kalimpong E Sitaharan, which was released in 2013.

Career
Om started his career by modeling and television appearances. He was a participant of Fata Fati Filmy Fight ( A Reality Show of ETV Bangla). He gained popularity in the television series Alor Basha. He made his feature film acting debut in Arjun – Kalimpong E Sitaharan as the title character Arjun, a young detective. He followed this with the 2014 film Action directed by Sayantan Mukherjee and co-starring Barkha Bisht Sengupta.  In 2015, he starred in the box office hit film Agnee 2 with Mahiya Mahi.

Om starred in three films in 2016: Angaar, Hero 420, and Prem Ki Bujhini with Subhashree Ganguly.

Television

 Alor Basha 
 Didi No. 1 (2021) aired on Zee Bangla
 Dance Bangla Dance (2021) as Mentor aired on Zee Bangla

Films

See also
 Eskay Movies

References

External links
 

Living people
Indian male film actors
Year of birth missing (living people)